St. Anthony's Greek Orthodox Monastery is a Greek Orthodox monastery standing in the Sonoran Desert of Arizona. It was established in the summer of 1995 in the name of Saint Anthony the Great. The closest town is Florence, Arizona. It is home for approximately 42 monks. It is open to both Orthodox and non-Orthodox visitors. Pilgrims can arrange to stay at the monastery in guest facilities, and other visitors are invited in daily from 10:30 am to 4:00 pm. Guests are asked to wear “modest and loose-fitting” clothing along with shoes or sandals.

History

In the summer of 1995, Elder Ephraim (a former abbot of Philotheou Monastery on Mount Athos with a history of restoring and repopulating previous monasteries) sent six monks of Athonite heritage to the Sonoran Desert of Arizona with aims to establish a new monastery in the name of Saint Anthony the Great, the father of monasticism. The fathers began by building the main church, monastic living quarters, the dining hall, and some guest facilities. They also began a vegetable garden, a small vineyard, citrus orchards, and an olive grove amidst the desert landscape. These areas are now interconnected by an elaborate system of gardens, pathways, and gazebos with Spanish fountains.

While the entire monastery is dedicated to Saint Anthony the Great, within its grounds are chapels dedicated to Seraphim of Sarov, Demetrius of Thessaloniki, John the Baptist, George the Martyr, Nicholas the Wonderworker, and Panteleimon the Healer. The main church is dedicated to Saint Anthony and Nectarios of Aegina.

In the summer of 2008, the building of a new chapel in the name of the Prophet Elias was completed on the hill east of the monastery. The chapel's first liturgy was celebrated on the feast day of the chapel's eponymous prophet. The chapel can be seen from up to five miles away.

Monasticism

Lifestyle

The monks of St. Anthony's Monastery practice Hesychasm (a mystical tradition of contemplative prayer) and adhere to the cenobitic monasticism. This includes a daily schedule of prayer and work under obedience to their abbot, whom assumes the role of their spiritual father. Their routine begins at midnight with time for personal prayer and spiritual reading, followed by the cycle of morning prayers and the Divine Liturgy. Next is a light breakfast and a period of rest before they begin their work day, attend to their prayers, and complete various tasks until evening. Of these tasks include, but are not limited to: gardening, groundskeeping, construction, vine dressing, woodworking, publishing, icon painting, food preparation, and tending to the hospitality of any guests of the monastery. Their day finishes with evening vespers and dinner.

Demographics

Most of the resident brotherhood of monks are Greek and Greek-American by heritage. Many of the community members (approximately 50 to 80 on an average Sunday) are also Greek-American. There are no female initiates, though women-only centers do exist in other parts of the United States.

Gallery

Grounds

Art

References

External links
 St. Anthony's Greek Orthodox Monastery, at OrthodoxWiki
 Official website

Christian monasteries in the United States
Churches in Arizona
Greek Orthodox monasteries
Florence, Arizona